John Frederick Haldon FBA (23 October 1948 in Newcastle upon Tyne) is a British historian, and Shelby Cullom Davis '30 Professor of European History emeritus, professor of Byzantine history and Hellenic Studies emeritus, as well as former director of the Mossavar-Rahmani Center for Iran and Persian Gulf Studies at Princeton University.

Early life and education
Haldon received his bachelor's degree from the University of Birmingham in 1970, with a thesis on "Arms, armour and tactical organisation of the Byzantine army from Maurice to Basil II", and his master's degree from the Ludwig Maximilian University of Munich in Germany. He returned to the University of Birmingham to complete his PhD in 1975 on "Aspects of Byzantine military administration: the Elite Corps, the Opsikion, and the Imperial Tagmata from the sixth to the ninth century" under the supervision of Anthony Bryer. Haldon also studied Modern Greek at the University of Athens. He initially wanted to study Roman-British history and work on post-Roman Britain, but eventually changed his field of study.

Career
After graduating from the University of Birmingham, Haldon held a post-doctoral fellowship at the Institut für Byzantinistik of the Ludwig Maximilian University of Munich (1976–1979). From 1980 to 1995, he was junior professor at the University of Birmingham. From 1995 to 2000, he was director of the Centre for Byzantine, Ottoman and Modern Greek Studies at the University of Birmingham. From 2000 to 2005, Haldon served as head of the School of Historical Studies at the University of Birmingham. 

In 2005 he joined the faculty of Princeton University, where he was professor of Byzantine history and Hellenic studies and (from 2009) the Shelby Cullom Davis Professor of European History until his retirement in 2018. He was concurrently a senior fellow at the Dumbarton Oaks Center for Byzantine Studies in Washington, D.C. from 2007 to 2013. At Princeton, Haldon also served as the director of graduate studies for the History Department (2009–2018) and as the founding director of the Mossavar-Rahmani Center for Iran and Persian Gulf Studies (2013–2018). He was the overall director of the Avkat Archaeological Project (2006–2012, fieldwork completed by 2010) under the aegis of the British Institute at Ankara. From 2013 he has been director of the Princeton Climate Change and History Research Initiative, and since 2018 director of the Environmental History Lab for the Program in Medieval Studies. 

He is the author and co-author of nearly 20 books, including six monographs: The Empire That Would Not Die: The Paradox of Eastern Roman Survival, 640–740 (2016), Byzantium in the Iconoclast Era c. 680–850: A History (with Leslie Brubaker, 2011), Warfare, State and Society in the Byzantine World, 565–1204 (1999), The State and the Tributary Mode of Production (1993), Byzantium in the Seventh Century: The Transformation of a Culture (1990) and Byzantine Praetorians: An Administrative, Institutional and Social Survey of the Opsikion and Tagmata, c. 580–900 (1984).

His research focuses on the history of the medieval eastern Roman (Byzantine) empire, in particular in the period from the seventh to the twelfth centuries; on state systems and structures across the European and Islamic worlds from late ancient to early modern times; on the impact of environmental stress on societal resilience in premodern social systems; and on the production, distribution and consumption of resources in the late ancient and medieval world.

Awards and honors
Fellow of the British Academy (2021)
Member, Archaeological Institute of America
Member, British Institute at Ankara
President of the Association Internationale des Etudes Byzantines
Corresponding Member of the Austrian Academy of Sciences in Vienna (2010)

Selected bibliography

Books authored
Recruitment and Conscription in the Byzantine Army c. 550–950: A Study on the Origins of the stratiotika ktemata, Vienna: Österreichische Akademie der Wissenschaften, 1979
Byzantine Praetorians: An Administrative, Institutional and Social Survey of the Opsikion and Tagmata, c. 580–900, Bonn: Habelt, 1984
Byzantium in the Seventh Century: The Transformation of a Culture, Cambridge: Cambridge University Press, 1990 (revised edition 1997)
The State and the Tributary Mode of Production, London: Verso, 1993
State, Army, and Society in Byzantium: Approaches to Military, Social, and Administrative History, 6th–12th Centuries, Brookfield, VT: Variorum, 1995
Warfare, State and Society in the Byzantine World, 565–1204, London: UCL Press, 1999
Byzantium: A History, Stroud: Tempus, 2000
The Byzantine Wars: Battles and Campaigns of the Byzantine Era, Stroud: Tempus, 2001
(with Leslie Brubaker) Byzantium in the Iconoclast Era (c.680–850): The Sources: An Annotated Survey, Aldershot: Ashgate, 2001
Byzantium at War, AD 600–1453, Oxford: Osprey, 2002
The Palgrave Atlas of Byzantine History, Basingstoke: Palgrave Macmillan, 2005
(with Leslie Brubaker) Byzantium in the Iconoclast Era c. 680–850: A History, Cambridge: Cambridge University Press, 2011
The Empire That Would Not Die: The Paradox of Eastern Roman Survival, 640–740, Cambridge, MA: Harvard University Press, 2016

Editions, translations and commentaries of primary sources
Constantine VII Porphyrogenitus, Three Treatises on Imperial Military Expeditions, Vienna: Österreichische Akademie der Wissenschaften, 1990
A Critical Commentary on the Taktika of Leo VI, Washington, DC: Dumbarton Oaks Research Library and Collection, 2014
A Tale of Two Saints: The Martyrdoms and Miracles of Saints Theodore ‘the Recruit’ and ‘the General’, Liverpool: Liverpool University Press, 2016
The De Thematibus (‘on the themes’) of Constantine VII Porphyrogenitus, Liverpool: Liverpool University Press, 2021

Edited volumes
(with Lawrence Conrad) Elites Old and New in the Byzantine and Early Islamic Near East: Papers of the Sixth Workshop on Late Antiquity and Early Islam, Princeton, NJ: Darwin Press, 2004
General Issues in the Study of Medieval Logistics: Sources, Problems, and Methodologies, Leiden: Brill, 2006
(with Elizabeth Jeffreys and Robin Cormack) The Oxford Handbook of Byzantine Studies, Oxford: Oxford University Press, 2008
The Social History of Byzantium, Chichester: Wiley-Blackwell, 2009
Money, Power and Politics in Early Islamic Syria: A Review of Current Debates, Farnham: Ashgate, 2010
(with Hugh Elton and James Newhard), Archaeology and Urban Settlement in Late Roman and Byzantine Anatolia: Euchaïta-Avkat-Beyözü and Its Environment, Cambridge: Cambridge University Press, 2018

References

External links
Data from the Avkat Archaeological Project

People from Newcastle upon Tyne
1948 births
20th-century British historians
21st-century British historians
British Byzantinists
British Marxist historians
Princeton University faculty
Princeton University
Living people
Scholars of Byzantine history
Byzantine archaeologists
Fellows of the British Academy